The Digital Library for Dutch Literature (Dutch: Digitale Bibliotheek voor de Nederlandse Letteren or DBNL) is a website (showing the abbreviation as dbnl) about Dutch language and Dutch literature. It contains thousands of literary texts, secondary literature and additional information, like biographies, portrayals etcetera, and hyperlinks. The DBNL is an initiative by the DBNL foundation that was founded in 1999 by the Society of Dutch Literature (Dutch: Maatschappij der Nederlandse Letterkunde).

Building of the DNBL was made possible by donations, among others, from the Dutch Organization for Scientific Research (Dutch: Nederlandse Organisatie voor Wetenschappelijk Onderzoek or NWO) and the Nederlandse Taalunie. From 2008 to 2012, the editor was René van Stipriaan. The work is done by eight people in Leiden (as of 2013: The Hague), 20 students, and 50 people in the Philippines who scan and type the texts.

 the library is being maintained by a collaboration of the Taalunie, Vlaamse Erfgoedbibliotheek (Flemish Libraries), and the Royal Library of the Netherlands.

Basic library: 1,000 key texts
The DBNL contains (or will contain in the near future), the complete so called "basic library" (Dutch: "basisbibliotheek") 1,000 deemed "key" texts of the Dutch and Flemish cultural history. The chairperson of the committee that selected the 1,000 key texts is Paul Schnabel. Nevertheless, some classic texts of Dutch literature, like Gerard Reve's 1947 novel The evenings (Dutch: De avonden) and Willem Frederik Hermans' 1966 novel Beyond Sleep (Dutch: Nooit meer slapen) are missing because of copyright reasons.

References

Translation from Dutch Wikipedia article, version 3 June 2007, 14:18

External links

  

1999 establishments in the Netherlands
Book websites
Dutch-language literature
Dutch-language websites
Dutch digital libraries
Open-access archives